South Rosemary is an unincorporated area and census-designated place (CDP) in Halifax County, North Carolina, United States. The population was 2,836 at the 2010 census. It is part of the Roanoke Rapids, North Carolina Micropolitan Statistical Area.

Geography
South Rosemary is located in northern Halifax County at  (36.445834, -77.700876). It is bordered to the east by the city of Roanoke Rapids.

U.S. Route 158 is the main road through the community, leading east into Roanoke Rapids and west  to Henderson.

Demographics

As of the census of 2000, there were 2,843 people, 1,184 households, and 790 families residing in the CDP. The population density was 462.0 people per square mile (178.5/km). There were 1,366 housing units at an average density of 222.0 per square mile (85.8/km). The racial makeup of the CDP was 49.35% White, 49.49% African American, 0.28% Native American, 0.21% Asian, 0.14% from other races, and 0.53% from two or more races. Hispanic or Latino of any race were 0.70% of the population.

There were 1,184 households, out of which 29.2% had children under the age of 18 living with them, 42.5% were married couples living together, 18.7% had a female householder with no husband present, and 33.2% were non-families. 29.0% of all households were made up of individuals, and 9.4% had someone living alone who was 65 years of age or older. The average household size was 2.40 and the average family size was 2.93.

In the CDP, the population was spread out, with 25.8% under the age of 18, 8.3% from 18 to 24, 28.7% from 25 to 44, 24.9% from 45 to 64, and 12.3% who were 65 years of age or older. The median age was 37 years. For every 100 females, there were 93.0 males. For every 100 females age 18 and over, there were 86.1 males.

The median income for a household in the CDP was $27,771, and the median income for a family was $32,237. Males had a median income of $26,445 versus $19,375 for females. The per capita income for the CDP was $11,409. About 16.8% of families and 25.1% of the population were below the poverty line, including 32.7% of those under age 18 and 28.9% of those age 65 or over.

References

Census-designated places in Halifax County, North Carolina
Census-designated places in North Carolina
Roanoke Rapids, North Carolina micropolitan area